Turners Siding is an unincorporated community in Lee County, Virginia, in the United States.

History
Turners Siding was named for Henry Turner, an early settler.

References

Unincorporated communities in Lee County, Virginia
Unincorporated communities in Virginia